The Unsellables may refer to:
The Unsellables (Canadian TV series), a Canadian television series that focuses on helping people sell their houses.
The Unsellables (UK TV series), a British television remake that also focuses on helping people sell homes.